The men's mass start competition of the Sochi 2014 Olympics was held at Laura Biathlon & Ski Complex. The race was initially scheduled for the evening of 16 February 2014, but it was rescheduled for the following morning due to poor visibility conditions. However, fog caused two additional delays on 17 February 2014, so the race was not run until the afternoon of 18 February.

Results
The race started at 14:30.

References

Mass start